Simon Delacroix (born 18 April 1982), better known by his stage name the Toxic Avenger, is a French DJ, songwriter, and record producer.

His first success was "Super Heroes" that resulted in a contract with Iheartcomix record label. He is known for his album Angst released on Roy Music label on 16 May 2011. He also released the music video directed by Wahib for the title track "Angst". He also released a number of EPs, and has had various collaborations with a number of artists including Canadian act Chromeo, Robert Bruce of the UK act South Central in "Never Stop" featuring Bruce and music video directed by Antoine Wagner. He also collaborated with French rapper Orelsan, particularly in his 2010 EP N'importe comment.

He performed under a mask up until his 2009 EP Toxic Is Dead, in 2009, symbolizing the death of the personality he'd donned in the group Ed Wood Is Dead.

He was also subject of a documentary SuperHero 2.0 broadcast on French music station M6.

Delacroix's stage name is a tribute to the cult B-movie of the same name.

In 2013 his song "Angst:two" appeared in Nissan Qashqai commercial.. While more recently in 2020, his song "Kids" has featured in a Yves Saint Laurent commercial.

Discography

Albums
2009: Scion CD Sampler Volume 26: The Toxic Avenger (Scion AV)
2011: Angst (Roy Music) (charted at #194 in SNEP French Albums Chart)
2013: Romance and Cigarettes
2016: Ξ (Roy Music)
2019: GLOBES (Roy Music)
2020: Midnight Resistance (Enchanté Records)
2022: Yes Future (Enchanté Records)

EPs and singles
2007: "Superheroes" (Iheartcomix Records)
2008: "Bad Girls Need Love Too" (Boxon Records)
2009: "Toxic is Dead" (Iheartcomix Records)
2010: "N'importe Comment" (with Orelsan) (Roy Music)
2010: "Angst:One" (Roy Music)
2011: "Never Stop" (feat. Robert Bruce) (Roy Music)
2011: "Alien Summer" (feat. Annie) (Little Owl Musical Recordings)
2012: 3/2/1 EP (Roy Music)
2012: "To the Sun" (feat. Tulip) (Roy Music)
2013: "Angst:Two" (Roy Music)
2015: "Over Me" (Roy Music)
2016: "GLOBE Vol.1" (Roy Music)
2017: "GLOBE Vol.2" (Roy Music)
2017: "GLOBE Vol.3" (Roy Music)
2018: "I" (Roy Music)
2018: "II" (Roy Music)
2019: "Black" (Enchanté Records)
2019: "Modular Session #1" (Enchanté Records)
2020: "Home Call (From Road 96)" (G4F Records, DigixArt, Enchanté Records)
2021: "Shifted" (Enchanté Records)
2021: "The Toxic Avenger Remixes" (Grá Mór Phonic Records)
2022: "All My Heros" (Dancing Dead)
2022: "BREACH" (Ubisoft Music)
2022: "Du haut du 33e étage" (Tricatel)
2022: "Carbon Toxique" (Enchanté Records)

Remixes

Other 
 Part of the soundtrack for Furi
My Only Chance
Make This Right
 and for Road 96
Home Call
Hit the Road
Keep Moving Forward
Petrias Road
Ultimatum
A New Life

References

External links
Official website
Discogs

French DJs
French electronic musicians
1982 births
Living people
Electronic dance music DJs